The Durrell family was an English family, two of whose members were best-selling writers. It has been the subject of several autobiographies, the TV series My Family and Other Animals (1987), the television film My Family and Other Animals (2005), the largely fictionalized TV series The Durrells (2016–2019), and the documentary What the Durrells Did Next.

Family members 

The family was founded by Lawrence Samuel Durrell (1884–1928), an Anglo-Indian engineer, and his wife Louisa Durrell (1886–1964). Their children were:
 Lawrence Durrell (1912–1990), a diplomat and writer, best known for writing The Alexandria Quartet, in addition to travel literature.
 Margery Durrell (1915–1916); died in infancy from diphtheria.
 Leslie Durrell (1917–1982), described in Gerald Durrell's Corfu trilogy as having an interest in guns, hunting, and sailing, and according to his sister's book Whatever Happened to Margo?, was interested in painting.
 Margaret Durrell (1919–2007), ran a boarding house in Bournemouth. Her account of that experience, Whatever Happened to Margo?, was published in 1995, about 40 years after she wrote it.
 Gerald Durrell (1925–1995), a popular naturalist, best-selling writer, television host and conservationist, credited with redefining the modern zoo. Founder of the Durrell Wildlife Conservation Trust.
 His first wife, Jacquie Durrell (b. 1929), author, naturalist and television host
 His second wife, Lee McGeorge Durrell (b. 1949), author, naturalist and Honorary Director of the Durrell Wildlife Conservation Trust

Lawrence Samuel Durrell, Louisa Durrell and their children were all born in India during the British Raj. Following Lawrence Samuel Durrell's death in 1928, Mrs Durrell and her three younger children moved to the United Kingdom, where Lawrence had already been sent to be educated. In 1935, the Durrells moved to the Greek island of Corfu. They remained there until the summer of 1939, when the impending outbreak of World War II forced most of them to return to England. Gerald's autobiographical Corfu trilogy and several short stories record the family's time in Corfu, albeit in a somewhat fictional way.

References

Family
English families
Literary families